Canon Gate or Canon Lane Gate is a Grade I listed gatehouse in Chichester, West Sussex.

History 
Canon Gate was erected during the reign of King Richard III, who ruled England from 1483 to 1485. The building fell into disrepair, but was restored in 1894 by Ewan Christian.

Detailing 
The building is made from flint, with stone dressings. The southern facing arch is inscribed with the arms of William of Wykeham or Winchester College.

See also 

 Grade I listed buildings in West Sussex

References 

Grade I listed buildings in West Sussex
Buildings and structures in Chichester